Trigonopterus yoda is a species of flightless weevil in the subfamily Cryptorhynchinae. It is endemic to Sulawesi, Indonesia.

The species was described in 2019 by Alexander Riedel and Raden Pramesa Narakusumosu based on the type series collected from central Sulawesi (Indonesia). It is named after the Star Wars character Yoda.

Trigonopterus yoda measure  in length.

See also 

 List of organisms named after the Star Wars series

References 

yoda
Beetles of Indonesia
Endemic fauna of Indonesia
Fauna of Sulawesi
Beetles described in 2019
Star Wars